The TI class of supertankers comprises the ships TI Africa, TI Asia, TI Europe and TI Oceania (all names as of July 2004), where the "TI" refers to the ULCC tanker pool operator Tankers International. The class were the first ULCCs (ultra-large crude carriers) to be built in 25 years.

By displacement, deadweight tonnage (≈ cargo mass), and gross tonnage (a formula value based on internal volume, not mass), the TI class ships are smaller only than Pioneering Spirit.

Compared to the TI class, the Maersk Triple E class container ships are longer and have a higher cargo volume, including above-deck containers.

The previous largest ship, the supertanker Seawise Giant, was dismantled in 2010.

History
All four oil tankers were constructed for shipping company Hellespont Group by Daewoo Shipbuilding & Marine Engineering in Okpo, South Korea, entering service between March 2002 and April 2003. The ships were originally named Hellespont Alhambra, Hellespont Fairfax, Hellespont Metropolis and Hellespont Tara.

In 2004, Belgian shipowner Euronav NV and partners purchased all four ships. Hellespont Fairfax, Hellespont Tara, Hellespont Alhambra and Hellespont Metropolis were renamed TI Oceania, TI Europe, TI Asia and TI Africa respectively.

Hellespont Fairfax was the subject of The Discovery Channel's television show Superships, episode "Launching a Leviathan—Hellespont Fairfax.

Hellespont Metropolis cost $89 million in 2002, requiring 700,000 man-hours of direct labor.

Features 
The class, each ship powered by a single HSD-Sulzer 9RTA84T-D delivering  at 76 rpm, possesses a relatively high service speed ( laden,   in ballast), which increases their earning capacity. The steel scantlings are greater than the class minimum.

These ships are wider than the new Panama Canal locks. They also cannot travel through the Suez Canal unless on a ballast voyage.

The coatings in the ballast tanks are protected by two features, a full-time double-scrubbing system supplying drier inert gas to the ballast tanks, and also by the white painted upper hull reflecting the sun’s energy. The inert gas system also increases safety. Keeping down the cargo temperatures also minimizes hydrocarbon emissions.

Conversion 
In 2009 and 2010, TI Asia and TI Africa were converted into sophisticated floating storage and offloading (FSO) vessels, moored off the coast of Qatar in the Persian Gulf at the Al Shaheen Oil Field. The extensive conversions were carried out by EuroNav and Overseas Shipholding Group at Drydocks World – Dubai.

In 2017, TI Europe was chartered by Statoil and converted to an FSO vessel, moored at Port of Kuala Sungai Linggi in Malaysia. In 2019, it was announced that TI Oceania would be converted to an FSO vessel and moored off the coast of Singapore.

Information obtained from IMO GISIS Ship and Company Particulars, MarineTraffic, Euronav and branches, and Subsidiaries of International Seaways 15 February 2020.

See also
 List of world's longest ships
 Seawise Giant
 Batillus-class supertankers

References

External links 
 Euronav vessels
 Seaways Fleet list
 shipspotting.com: Categorized ship photos
 Hellespont homepage

Oil tankers
Ships built by Daewoo Shipbuilding & Marine Engineering